The U.S. state of Georgia is divided into 159 counties, more than any other state except for Texas, which has 254 counties. Under the Georgia State Constitution, all of its counties are granted home rule to deal with problems that are purely local in nature. Each county has a county seat. In Georgia, county seats typically have a courthouse at a town square. Of the current 159 counties and two historic counties, 47 counties have changed their county seat at least once.

History
When counties were established some counties already had towns, which were soon named county seats. Several counties upon establishment lacked populations centers and did not have a county seat for a year or more. Typically during those periods without a definite county seat, county courts and other local government business was held at the residences of community leaders or at churches. A county changing county seats in Georgia has become very rare since the 1920s, as has the creation of new counties. The last county to legally change its county seat was Bryan County because of the establishment of Fort Stewart in the 1930s. Columbia County has two county seats. Its de facto county seat since the 1980s has been Evans, Georgia. Its de jure county seat remains Appling.

While some Georgian counties have kept their same county seat since they were first created, many other counties have had their county seat changed one or more times. County seats in Georgia have changed over time for a variety of reasons. Among the more common reasons for county seats being changed include:
 Towns along waterways growing as steamships were introduced
 Railroads bypassing the county seat
 Shifting county lines changing the center of population

A few county seats have regained their position of county seat after losing it:
Morgan was the county seat of Calhoun County from 1856 to 1923; it was re-designated the county seat in 1929
Stark(s)ville was the county seat of Lee County from 1832 to 1854, and then again from 1856 to 1872
Vienna, then known as Berrien, was the county seat of Dooly County from 1826 to 1836; it was re-designated the county seat in 1841
Waynesville was the county seat of Wayne County for several nonconsecutive periods in the mid-1800s

Three county seats have later become the county seats of other counties:
Pond Town was the temporary county seat of Lee County, Georgia when the county was first established from Muscogee (Creek) Nation lands in 1826. The county was very large and otherwise lacked European-American settlement.  It was replaced in 1828. Pond Town evolved to become the town of Ellaville and became the county seat of Schley County in 1857.
Lumpkin was named the county seat of Randolph County on December 2, 1830. On December 23, 1830 Stewart County was created from the section of Randolph where Lumpkin was. Lumpkin became the county seat of Stewart County on December 30, 1830.
Watkinsville was the county seat of Clarke County from 1802 to 1871 when it was replaced by Athens, and then became the county seat of Oconee in 1875 when it was created.

On three occasions, the creation of new counties has put a current county seat completely outside of the new boundaries of a county:
In 1812, when Emanuel County was created from Montgomery County, the county seat of the plantation of Arthur Lott was transferred to the new county
In 1830, Lumpkin was named the county seat of Randolph County; three weeks later Stewart County was created
In 1851, Van Wert, Georgia the county seat of Paulding County was transferred to Polk County when it was created

County seat listing

See also
List of counties in Georgia (U.S. state)
List of county courthouses in Georgia (U.S. state)

References

External links
 

Seats
Georgia (U.S. state) geography-related lists